William Ellsworth Glasscock (December 13, 1862 – April 12, 1925) was an American politician who served as the 13th Governor of West Virginia as a Republican from 1909 to 1913.

Glasscock worked for several years as a teacher, becoming the superintendent of schools in 1887 before leaving education to become the clerk of the county circuit court in 1890. He was admitted to the bar in 1903 and began practicing law. He worked as an attorney for Senator Stephen B. Elkins. At Elkins' recommendation, Glasscock was appointed as the internal revenue collection for the District of West Virginia in 1905 by President Theodore Roosevelt.

In 1908, Glasscock resigned from this position to run for governor. He ran as the Republican nominee for Governor of West Virginia in 1908, beating Louis Bennett Sr. by 12,133 votes. In his last year as governor, he declared martial law three times, sending troops to quell violent Coal Wars. Glasscock then returned to practicing law.

Biography 
Glasscock was born on a farm near Arnettsville, Virginia, now  part of Monongalia County, West Virginia on December 13, 1862. He was educated in the local public school system and graduated from West Virginia University in Morgantown, West Virginia. In 1888, he married Mary Miller.

He died in Morgantown, West Virginia and was buried in Oak Grove Cemetery.

References

External links
 Biography of William E. Glasscock
 Inaugural Address of William E. Glasscock
 The * West Virginia & Regional History Center at West Virginia University has two collections of William E. Glasscock's papers, A&M 6 and A&M 1447

1862 births
1925 deaths
Republican Party governors of West Virginia
Politicians from Morgantown, West Virginia
West Virginia University alumni
Methodists from West Virginia
20th-century American politicians
Lawyers from Morgantown, West Virginia
Burials at Oak Grove Cemetery (Morgantown, West Virginia)